Century 21 Department Stores LLC was an American chain of department stores, headquartered in New York City, which had 13 locations in the northeastern United States at the time of its closing in 2020 and is planned to reopen in 2023.

History

The company was founded in 1961, by Sonny Gindi, Ralph I Gindi, and Al Gindi. The original store is located at 472 86th Street in Bay Ridge, Brooklyn. Founder Al Gindi's son, Raymond Gindi, served as Century 21's chief operating officer.

The Century 21 flagship location is at 22 Cortlandt Street in Lower Manhattan, New York City, New York, United States of America, a site of the former East River Savings Bank (eventually merged into Marine Midland Bank and today into KeyBank). It occupies the base of a 34-story office tower, and it has recently added a Financier Patisserie coffee shop to its third floor. The store became an emotional flashpoint during and after the September 11 attacks. The store was evacuated after the first plane hit the World Trade Center, and the interior was significantly damaged from the collapse of the Twin Towers. Initially, it was not certain that the store would be rebuilt, but the owners opted to remain at the same site and the store was renovated and reopened on February 28, 2002, five months after the attacks. Thousands of people waited hours on the morning of the reopening so they could have a sales receipt from that day.

The firm opened its first location outside of the greater New York metropolitan area in October 2014, housed on two floors of the former Strawbridge's flagship on Market Street in Center City, Philadelphia.

The company expanded in 2016, opening at Sawgrass Mills in Sunrise, Florida.

In March 2016, Century 21 announced that it would open a flagship location at American Dream. Due to Century 21 filling for chapter 11 bankruptcy, this location never opened and is now another department store called The ADdress.
In addition Century 21 was also supposed to open a new location at the Staten Island Mall in New Springville, New York in the lower level of the former Sears Store and at the Roosevelt Field (shopping mall) in Garden City, New York which was supposed to be a relocation of their Westbury, New York in the mall's former Bloomingdale's Home Furniture location. Both of these locations are also now closed.

On Thursday September 10, 2020, Century 21 filed for Chapter 11 bankruptcy, as a result of Insurance companies failing to financially support the chain during the COVID-19 pandemic. Century 21 closed all of its locations by Sunday, December 6, 2020, with a few exceptions; three locations closed on October 5, 2020, including The Mills at Jersey Gardens in Elizabeth, New Jersey, The Lincoln Square, Manhattan location near Lincoln Center location in New York City, New York and Sawgrass Mills in Sunrise, Florida. The other exception being the Bergen Town Center Store in Paramus, New Jersey closed on Saturday, December 5, 2020, due the Bergen County Blue Laws that prevents all non-essential retailers from operating on Sundays.

On February 25, 2021, Century 21 announced it would resume operations sometime in 2021.

As of 2022, Century 21 gave up control of its original location.

It was announced on May 17, 2022, Century 21 will reopen the lower Manhattan location in the spring of 2023.

In February 17, 2023, Century 21 announced that the Cortland Street location could reopen as soon as April 2023 and that the Bay Ridge store would also reopen in the future as part of a shopping centre developed by the Gindi's, they also said that they planned to open more locations in the USA & internationally.

References

External links 
 

Department stores of the United States
Shops in New York City
American companies established in 1961
Retail companies established in 1961
Commercial buildings in Manhattan
1961 establishments in New York City
Companies that filed for Chapter 11 bankruptcy in 2020
Defunct department stores based in New York City
Retail companies disestablished in 2020